"Keke" (stylized in all caps) is a song written and performed by American rappers 6ix9ine, Fetty Wap and A Boogie wit da Hoodie. The song was released commercially on January 14, 2018 for streaming and digital download by ScumGang Records. "Keke" is produced by WalteezyAFN and is the third single by 6ix9ine from his debut mixtape Day69 (2018).

Background
The song was previewed by 6ix9ine in late 2017 via his Instagram, with the song leaking on December 29, 2017.

Music video
The music video was premiered by WorldStarHipHop via the official YouTube channel on January 14, 2018. It was directed by Figure Eight Films and features 6ix9ine, Fetty Wap and A Boogie wit da Hoodie in the streets of New York, in similar vein to 6ix9ine's music videos for "Gummo", "Kooda", and "Billy".

Commercial performance
The song entered at number 63 on the US Billboard Hot 100, peaking at number 43 on the chart dated February 3, 2018.

Charts

Certifications

References

2018 singles
2018 songs
6ix9ine songs
A Boogie wit da Hoodie songs
Fetty Wap songs
Songs written by Fetty Wap
Trap music songs
Songs written by 6ix9ine
Songs written by A Boogie wit da Hoodie